Brigadier Guy Hudleston Boisragon VC (5 November 1864 – 14 July 1931) was a recipient of the Victoria Cross, the highest and most prestigious award for gallantry in the face of the enemy that can be awarded to British and Commonwealth forces.

Boisragon was 27 years old, and a lieutenant in the Indian Staff Corps, British Indian Army, and 5th Gurkha Rifles during the Hunza-Naga Campaign, India when the following deed took place for which he was awarded the VC.

On 2 December 1891 during the attack on Nilt Fort, India, Lieutenant Boisragon led the assault, forcing his way through difficult obstacles to the inner gate, when he returned for reinforcements, moving fearlessly to and fro under heavy cross-fire until he had collected sufficient men to drive the enemy from the fort.

He later achieved the rank of brigadier.

Medal entitlement 
Brigadier Guy Hudleston Boisragon is entitled to the following medals

See also 
 List of Brigade of Gurkhas recipients of the Victoria Cross

Notes

External links 
Location of grave and VC medal (Kensal Green Cemetery)

British recipients of the Victoria Cross
1864 births
1931 deaths
People educated at Charterhouse School
Burials at Kensal Green Cemetery
British military personnel of the Hunza-Naga Campaign
People from Kohat District
British military personnel of the Tirah campaign
Indian Army personnel of World War I
Indian Staff Corps officers
British military personnel of the Hazara Expedition of 1888